Cherry Tree may refer to:
 A bush that produces cherries
 An ornamental cherry bush that produces cherry blossoms

Places

United Kingdom
 Cherry Tree, Lancashire
 Location of Cherry Tree railway station

United States
Cherry Tree, Indiana, a suburb of Carmel, Indiana, United States
 Cherry Tree, Oklahoma
 Cherry Tree, Pennsylvania, a borough in Indiana County, Pennsylvania, United States
 Cherrytree Township, Venango County, Pennsylvania, United States

Music
"The Cherry Trees", song by Ivor Gurney
 The Cherry-Tree Carol, a ballad with the rare distinction of being both a Christmas carol and one of the Child Ballads
 Cherrytree Records, an imprint of Interscope Records founded in 2005 by Martin Kierszenbaum
 "Cherry Tree", a song by 10,000 Maniacs from their 1987 album In My Tribe 
 Cherry Tree (EP), an EP by The National released 2004

Other uses
Cherry Tree Park, a park in Herttoniemi, Helsinki, Finland
George Washington#Cherry tree, story about first US President's childhood honesty
 Rock-Breaking Cherry Tree, a 400-year-old cherry tree growing out of a granite boulder in Morioka, Iwate in northern Japan
 Cherry Tree, a literary journal published by Washington College
CherryTree, an American computer company

See also
Cherry (disambiguation)
The Cherrytree Sessions (disambiguation)